Gavriil Filippovich Beljagin (also went by Gabriel; Russian: Гавриил Филиппович Белягин; 22 April 1870 – 9 August 1936) was a Russian-Estonian politician who was the deputy mayor of Reval (now Tallinn) from April 1917 to September of that year. He was the city's commissioner until he was selected by then mayor Jaan Poska to serve as deputy mayor in April 1917, when Poska went on to become the commissar of the Autonomous Governorate of Estonia. Beljagin oversaw the establishment of Estonian as the official language of Reval. He resigned just before the October Revolution and the start of the Russian Civil War in late 1917. He was succeeded by Voldemar Vöölmann as the chairman of city government. He later died on 9 August 1936 and is buried at Siselinna Cemetery.

See also
List of mayors of Tallinn

References

1870 births
1936 deaths
Politicians from Tallinn
People from the Governorate of Estonia
Estonian people of Russian descent
Mayors of Tallinn